Dilshan Kollure (born 18 December 1997) is a Sri Lankan cricketer. He made his List A debut on 17 December 2019, for Kurunegala Youth Cricket Club in the 2019–20 Invitation Limited Over Tournament. He made his Twenty20 debut on 10 January 2020, for Kurunegala Youth Cricket Club in the 2019–20 SLC Twenty20 Tournament. He made his first-class debut on 31 January 2020, for Kurunegala Youth Cricket Club in Tier B of the 2019–20 Premier League Tournament.

References

External links
 

1997 births
Living people
Sri Lankan cricketers
Kurunegala Youth Cricket Club cricketers
People from Matale